Elijah Stewart (born November 14, 1995) is an American professional basketball player for Napoli Basket of the Italian Lega Basket Serie A (LBA). He played college basketball for the USC Trojans. In high school, he was ranked as a four-star prospect in the Class of 2014.

College career
Stewart played college basketball for the University of Southern California, where he left as the school's all-time leader in three-point field goals made with 245. He averaged 12.3 points and 3.9 rebounds per game as a junior. In the NCAA Tournament, Stewart scored 22 points and hit the game winning basket, in a win over SMU. After the season he declared for the NBA draft, but ultimately returned to college. As a senior, Stewart averaged 11.7 points and 3.0 rebounds per game. He was also strong on defense and finished with 21 blocks on the season, second on the team. He had a season-high 28 points in a victory over Oregon State on February 16.

Professional career

Fort Wayne Mad Ants (2018–2019)
After graduating from USC, he went undrafted in the 2018 NBA draft. He later signed an Exhibit 10 deal with the Indiana Pacers, which included Summer League and training camp. Stewart was cut by the Pacers on October 11, 2018. He was subsequently added to the Fort Wayne Mad Ants training camp roster.

Wisconsin Herd (2019)
On January 22, 2019, the Fort Wayne Mad Ants announced that they had traded Stewart to the Wisconsin Herd with the returning player rights to Alex Hamilton for Jordan Barnett and Ike Nwamu. On March 8, 2019, Stewart was waived by the Herd.

Helsinki Seagulls (2019–2020)
On August 20, 2019, he has signed with Helsinki Seagulls of the Finnish Korisliiga.

Śląsk Wrocław (2020–2021)
On July 15, 2020, he signed with Śląsk Wrocław of the Polish Basketball League. Stewart was named league player of the week on November 10, after contributing 30 points, six rebounds and two assists in a win against Wilki Morskie Szczecin. Stewart hit a game-winning shot of the decisive Game 3 of the league's bronze medal game against Legia Warsaw.

U-BT Cluj-Napoca (2021–2022)
On August 6, 2021, he has signed with Cluj of the Romanian Liga Națională.

Napoli Basket (2022–present)
On July 19, 2022, he has signed with Napoli Basket of the Italian Lega Basket Serie A (LBA).

References

External links
USC Trojans bio

1995 births
Living people
American men's 3x3 basketball players
American expatriate basketball people in Finland
American expatriate basketball people in Poland
American men's basketball players
Basketball players from Los Angeles
Basketball players from Louisiana
Big3 players
Fort Wayne Mad Ants players
Helsinki Seagulls players
People from DeRidder, Louisiana
Śląsk Wrocław basketball players
Small forwards
USC Trojans men's basketball players
Westchester High School (Los Angeles) alumni
Wisconsin Herd players
Napoli Basket players